The 2022 Kyrgyz Premier League is the 31st season of the Kyrgyzstan League, Kyrgyzstan's top division of association football organized by the Football Federation of Kyrgyz Republic.

Teams

Team overview

Note: Table lists in alphabetical order.

Personnel and kits

Note: Flags indicate national team as has been defined under FIFA eligibility rules. Players and Managers may hold more than one non-FIFA nationality.

Managerial changes

Foreign players
The number of foreign players is restricted to five per Kyrgyz Premier League team. A team can use only five foreign players on the field in each game.

League table
</onlyinclude>

Results

Round 1–18

Round 19–27

By match played

Season statistics

Top scorers

Hat-tricks

 4 Player scored 4 goals

Awards

References

External links

Kyrgyzstan League seasons
1
Kyrgyzstan